This is the discography for American rock band Calexico.

Studio albums

Live albums

Soundtracks
 Committed (Soundtrack) CD (2000)
 Circo (Soundtrack) CD & Vinyl (2010)
 The Guard (Soundtrack) CD & Vinyl (2011)

Tour only and miscellaneous albums
 98–99 Road Map (1999), tour CD
 Travelall (2000), tour CD & Vinyl (2012)
 Tête à Tête (2001), side project as ABBC with Amor Belhom Duo
 Tool Box (2007), tour CD
 Festin D'Aden * Elysee Montmartre, Paris * March 08, 2001 (2008), 2xCDr limited to 50 copies
 Selections From Road Atlas- 1998-2011 (2011), Tour CD

EPs and singles
 Spark/The Ride (1996), 7" single
 Lacquer/Drape (1996), 7" single
 Stray (1998)
 The Ride (Pt 2) (1996)
 Underworld D-Tales Vol. 7 (1999)
 Service & Repair (2000)
 Crystal Frontier (2000)
 The Ballad of Cable Hogue (2000)
 Descamino (2000)
 Ballad Of Cable Hogue (2000)
 Even My Sure Things Fall Through (2001)
 Crystal Frontier (2001) Double Single "Quarterstick Records"
 Clothes Of Sand / New Partner (2001), 7″ split single with The Frames
 Alone Again Or (2003)
 Quattro (World Drifts In)''' (2003)
 Convict Pool (2004)
 Live In The KFJC Pit (2004), 7″ split single with Camper Van Beethoven
 Black Heart (2004)
 In the Reins (2005), with Iron & Wine
 Cruel (2006)
 Bisbee Blue (2006)
 Live Session EP (2006)
 The Guns of Brixton / Interior of a Dutch House (2006), 7″ split single with Beirut
 Intervention/Ocean of Noise (2007) (Arcade Fire/Calexico)
 Two Silver Trees/Bend to the Road (2008)
 Inspiratie/Oo (2008) (DeKift/Calexico)
 Inspiración/El Gatillo (2009) 7" promo
 Splitter (2012)
 Maybe On Monday (2013), Tour CD & 12" Vinyl
 Tapping on the Line (2015) CDr promo
 Falling From The Sky (2015) BEL Tip #57
 Cumbia de Donde (2015) BEL Tip #80
 Roll Tango (2016)
 End of the World with You (2017) US AAA #27 BEL Tip #38
 Under the Wheels (2018) US AAA #31

DVDs
 World Drifts In: Live at the Barbican (2004) & Vinyl
 Live From Austin TX (Austin City Limits) (2009)

Compilations
 Selections From Road Atlas: 1988–2011 (2011)

Compilation contributions
 Committed Soundtrack (2000)
 It's a Cool, Cool Christmas – "Gift Xchange" (2000), a charity compilation by Xfm
 All Tomorrow's Parties 1.0 - "Piker Sam" (2001)
 Nothing Left to Lose: A Tribute to Kris Kristofferson – "Casey's Last Ride" (2003)
 Dead Man's Shoes :"Untitled II" "Untitled III"  "Ritual Road Map""Crooked Road and the Briar" - Soundtrack (2004)
 Por Vida: A Tribute To The Songs Of Alejandro Escovedo - "Wave" (2004)
 Music From The Film "Happy Endings" - "Glimpse" and "Old Man Waltz" (2005)
 Sweetheart 2005: Love Songs – "Love Will Tear Us Apart" (2005), Hear Music
 Acoustic 07 – "Cruel" (2007), V2 Records
 I'm Not There: Original Soundtrack – "Goin' to Acapulco" (2007) The band also provide backing for other artists on several tracks. Goin' to Acapulco (Jim James & Calexico) (4:59)Dark eyes (Iron & Wine & Calexico) (4:30)One more cup of coffee (Roger McGuinn & Calexico) (4:31)Senor (Tales of Yankee Power) (Willie Nelson & Calexico) (5:18) Just like a woman (Charlotte Gainsbourg & Calexico) (4:20)
 Lammbock: Original Soundtrack Chris Gaffney Tribute: The Man of Somebody's Dreams - "Frank's Tavern" (2009)10 Years in the Ground: Radio 1190 Presents Live Recordings - "Crystal Frontier" (2009)
 El Alpinista De Los Sueños - Tributo A Antonio Vega - "Mi Hogar En Cualquier Sitio" (2010)
 Luz de Vida – "Absent Afternoon" (2011)

Remixes
 Two Lone Swordsmen - "Tiny Reminder No3 (Calexico Remix)" on Two Lone Swordsmen's EP "Further Reminders" (2001)
 Goldfrapp – "Human" (Calexico Vocal Version) on Goldfrapp's EP "Human"(2001)
 ISO68 – "Stoppages Est Plus (Calexico Remix)" on ISO68's EP "Here / There Played By" (2003)

 Collaborations 
 On Jean-Louis Murat's album Mustango (1999)
 On Françoiz Breut's album Vingt à Trente Mille Jours (2000)
 On Neko Case's album Blacklisted (2002)
 On Jenny Toomey's album Tempting (2002), a collection of songs by Franklin Bruno
 On Nancy Sinatra's album Nancy Sinatra (a.k.a. To Nancy With Love) (2004)
 "Don't Leave Me Now" on Amparanoia's album Rebeldia Con Alegria (2004)
 On Los Super Seven's album Heard It on the X (2005)
 Esa Banda En Dub – with Nortec Collective's Panoptica included in Tijuana Sessions Vol. 3 (2005)
 On Françoiz Breut's album Une Saison Volée (2005)
 You Can't Always Listen to Hausmusik, But... (2006) – "Careless" (with The Notwist) and "Freunde" (with A Million Mercies)
 On Neko Case's album Fox Confessor Brings the Flood (2006)
 "Amor Porteño" on Gotan Project's album Lunático (2006)
 On Marianne Dissard's album "Dedicated To Your Walls. May They Keep Blooming" (2006), performed and composed by Joey Burns.
 On Naïm Amor's album Sanguine (2007)
 On Marianne Dissard's album "L'Entredeux" (2008), performed, produced and composed by Joey Burns. Also, with John Convertino on drums.
 On Lizz Wright's album The Orchard (2008)
 On Naïm Amor's EP Introducing... (2008)
 On Depedro's album Depedro (2008)
 On Neko Case's album Middle Cyclone (2009)
 On Naïm Amor's EP Precious Second (2009)
 On Depedro's album On Tour (2009)
 On Susie Hug's album Tucson Moonshine (2010)
 On Amparo Sánchez's album Tucson-Habana (2010)
 On Depedro's album Nubes De Papel (2010)
 On Maggie Björklund's album Coming Home (2011)
 On Neko Case's album The Worse Things Get, the Harder I Fight, the Harder I Fight, the More I Love You (2013)

 Chart positions 
 Hot Rail – 2000 – UK No. 57
 Feast of Wire – 2003 – No. 23 Independent Albums, No. 45 Heatseekers, UK No. 71
 In the Reins – 2005 – No. 135 Billboard 200, No. 12 Independent Albums, UK No. 161
 Garden Ruin – 2006 – No. 156 Billboard 200, No. 14 Independent Albums, No. 3 Heatseekers, UK No. 76
 Carried To Dust'' – 2008 – No. 98 Billboard 200, No. 9 Independent Albums, No. 28 European Albums, UK No. 55

References 

Discographies of American artists
Country music discographies
Rock music group discographies